Guillaume III. d'Assat also known as ou Guilielmus was a fourteenth century Catholic Bishop of Oloron in France.

Biography
According to the La Grande Encyclopédie he was Bishop of Oloron from 3 June 1371 until his resignation in 1394, although the dates given in the le Trésor de Chronologie are slightly different. There is some hint that he was pressured to resign. After his resignation rival claimants contested to be bishop, as part of the Avignon Papacy controversy. Armand-Guilhem de Bury was the Avignon nomination, while Ogier Vilesongnes was Rome's nomination.

See also

References

14th-century French Roman Catholic bishops
Bishops of Oloron
Catholicism-related controversies